Muzaffar Ali is a Bangladesh Awami League politician and the former Member of Parliament of Comilla-8.

Career
Ali was elected to parliament from Comilla-8 as a Bangladesh Awami League candidate in 1973. He founded Muzaffar Ali Foundation and Muzaffar Ali High School and College.

Death
Ali died on 29 November 1998 following cardiac failure.

References

Awami League politicians
1998 deaths
1st Jatiya Sangsad members